James Joseph FitzPatrick, III (born February 1, 1964) is a retired American football offensive tackle.

James Fitzpatrick was born in Heidelberg, Germany in 1964. He began his Football career in Beaverton, Oregon where he was a two way starter for the State Champion Beaverton High School Beavers. He attended USC (University Of Southern California) where he was an outstanding offensive tackle. He played in the 1985 Rose Bowl against Ohio State defeating them 20 - 17. During his senior year, he was voted Offensive MVP (Most Valuable Player), extremely unusual for an offensive lineman.

He was drafted in the first round (13th overall) by the San Diego Chargers in 1986. He played five seasons for the Chargers. He was traded to the then Los Angeles Raiders in 1990 where he returned to the Colosseum for the remainder of his career.

James now lives in Portland, Oregon, he is active in youth football.

College career
He played college football at the University of Southern California, where he was voted Offensive MVP his senior year.

Professional career
FitzPatrick played in the National Football League between 1986 and 1993.

References

External links
NFL.com player page
www.iamaudi.com
1986 NFL Draft page

1964 births
Living people
American football offensive tackles
USC Trojans football players
Los Angeles Raiders players
San Diego Chargers players
Beaverton High School alumni